The 2018 Toronto Blue Jays season was the 42nd season of the franchise in the American League East division of Major League Baseball (MLB), and the 28th full season of play (29th overall) at Rogers Centre.

Offseason
During his end-of-season press conference on October 3, 2017, general manager Ross Atkins confirmed that the Blue Jays would decline their mutual option on José Bautista and allow him to enter free agency. Atkins also announced that the team would retain their entire coaching staff entering 2018. On October 11, the team dismissed their assistant athletic trainer, Mike Frostad, as well as head strength coach Chris Joyner. Darrell Ceciliani, Bo Schultz, and César Valdez were outrighted to the Triple-A Buffalo Bisons on November 1. The following day, Brett Anderson, Darwin Barney, Miguel Montero, and Michael Saunders became free agents. On November 4, José Bautista's $17 million mutual option for the 2018 season was officially declined by the Blue Jays, making him a free agent. Leonel Campos, Taylor Cole, Raffy Lopez, and Luis Santos were outrighted to Triple-A on November 6, and pitcher Taylor Guerrieri was claimed off waivers from the Tampa Bay Rays. Former Blue Jays pitcher Roy Halladay died on November 7, when his ICON A5 amphibious airplane crashed into the Gulf of Mexico near the Tampa Bay area of Florida. He was the only person in the airplane. The Blue Jays organization later announced plans to honour Halladay before their game on Opening Day and throughout the 2018 season, by retiring his number and wearing a black 32 patch on their jerseys for the year.

On November 20, the Blue Jays acquired Gift Ngoepe from the Pittsburgh Pirates, outrighted Chris Rowley and Harold Ramírez, lost Rob Refsnyder on a waiver claim by the Cleveland Indians, and added Conner Greene, Danny Jansen, Reese McGuire, Thomas Pannone, and Rowdy Tellez to the 40-man roster in order to protect them from the Rule 5 draft. The Blue Jays organization experienced a spike in positive tests for performance-enhancing drugs during November. Six players with the Dominican Summer League Blue Jays and one with the Gulf Coast League Blue Jays were suspended after testing positive. The team announced on November 23 that they would begin an internal investigation into the positive reports. Late in the month, it was announced that assistant general manager Andrew Tinnish had been hired by the Atlanta Braves, who had recently hired former Blue Jays general manager Alex Anthopoulos. On December 1, Tinnish announced he had withdrawn from his position with Atlanta and would remain with Toronto. Also on December 1, the Blue Jays non-tendered Ryan Goins and Tom Koehler, and traded minor league outfielder J. B. Woodman to the St. Louis Cardinals for infielder Aledmys Díaz. Head athletic trainer George Poulis, who had been with the Blue Jays organization for 18 years, was hired by the Atlanta Braves on December 5.

On January 6, 2018, the Blue Jays traded Edward Olivares and Jared Carkuff to the San Diego Padres for infielder Yangervis Solarte. Ezequiel Carrera, Josh Donaldson, Dominic Leone, Aaron Loup, Kevin Pillar, Aaron Sanchez, and Devon Travis each avoided salary arbitration with the Blue Jays on January 12, agreeing to one-year contracts. Marcus Stroman and Roberto Osuna were unable to reach agreements with the team prior to the deadline. Dominic Leone and prospect Conner Greene were traded to the St. Louis Cardinals for outfielder Randal Grichuk on January 19. Curtis Granderson's one-year, $5 million contract became official on January 23. MLB revealed their top 100 prospects list on January 27, with Blue Jays prospects Vladimir Guerrero Jr., Bo Bichette, and Anthony Alford ranking 3rd, 14th, and 47th respectively.

Roberto Osuna lost his arbitration case with the Blue Jays on February 3, and was awarded the team's $5.3 million contract instead of his requested $5.8 million. Jerry Howarth, the team's play-by-play announcer, announced his retirement on February 13 after 36 seasons with the Blue Jays. On February 15, Marcus Stroman announced through his Twitter account that he had lost his arbitration case and would make $6.5 million for the season instead of his requested salary of $6.9 million. Later that day, the team announced Jaime García had been signed to a one-year, $8 million contract that included a 2019 team option.

Trades

Free agency

In

Out

Waivers

In

Out

Spring training
Blue Jays pitchers and catchers reported to spring training on February 14, while position players reported on February 19. Seung-hwan Oh signed a one-year, $2 million contract with Toronto on February 26. To make room on the roster, Ezequiel Carrera was designated for assignment. Carrera later cleared waivers and was invited back to spring training. Nick Tepesch signed a minor league contract with the Blue Jays on March 3, and was invited to spring training. Early in spring training, it was announced that Troy Tulowitzki had a bone spur in his right ankle, and that he would miss the start of the Grapefruit League season. On March 4, manager John Gibbons stated Tulowitzki was unlikely to be ready for Opening Day. Top prospects Vladimir Guerrero Jr. and Bo Bichette made their Grapefruit League debuts on March 8, and combined to go 6-for-8 with two RBIs and three runs scored in Toronto's 9–3 win over the Baltimore Orioles. The Blue Jays made their first cuts of spring training on March 10, optioning Rowdy Tellez to the Triple-A Buffalo Bisons, and sending Jon Harris, Sean Reid-Foley, and Jordan Romano to minor league camp. The following day, Ryan Borucki and Thomas Pannone were optioned to Buffalo, and Ezequiel Carrera was released.

On March 12, Gibbons announced that Marcus Stroman would not start on Opening Day due to shoulder inflammation he suffered early in spring training. Major League Baseball announced an 80-game suspension for Thomas Pannone on March 16, after he tested positive for a banned performance-enhancing substance. On March 20, Gibbons revealed that J. A. Happ would start on Opening Day, and be followed in the five-man rotation by Aaron Sanchez, Marco Estrada, Marcus Stroman, and Jaime García. On March 26 and 27, the Blue Jays returned to Montreal's Olympic Stadium for two games against the St. Louis Cardinals. The team finished spring training with a 14–18 record and one tie.

Standings

American League East

American League Wild Card

Records vs opponents

2018 draft
The 2018 Major League Baseball draft began on June 4 and concluded on June 6.

Regular season

Opening Day

March and April
The Blue Jays opened the 2018 regular season with a four-game series against the New York Yankees. Roy Halladay, who died in the offseason in a plane crash, was honoured before the game and had his number 32 retired by the team. In the first game, Yankees' offseason acquisition Giancarlo Stanton led the way on offence, hitting two home runs in the 6–1 loss for Toronto. Masahiro Tanaka held the Toronto offence at bay in game two, yielding just a single run in six innings as the Jays fell 4–2. Toronto earned their first win of the 2018 season in the third game, 5–3. Yangervis Solarte hit the go-ahead home run in the eighth inning, before Kevin Pillar added an insurance run by stealing home, after having singled and stolen both second and third base. The Blue Jays split the series with a 7–4 win on April 1, thanks to Justin Smoak's grand slam in the eighth inning. The team then began a three-game series against the Chicago White Sox. Russell Martin's first home run of the season gave the Jays the lead in the seventh inning, and Roberto Osuna earned his second save of the year in the 4–2 victory. A seven-run eighth inning by the Jays in the second game led to a 14–5 rout of Chicago. The Blue Jays were denied their first sweep of the season, after José Abreu's go-ahead solo home run gave the White Sox a 4–3 win.

The Blue Jays opened their 2018 road play in Arlington for three games against the Texas Rangers. The Jays took an 8–0 lead in the sixth inning of the first game, and held on to win 8–5. The Rangers took the second game, 5–1, with Rangers starter Mike Minor earning his first win as a starting pitcher since the 2014 season. In the rubber match, Rangers ace Cole Hamels allowed two first-inning home runs, and Toronto took the series with a 7–4 victory. The Jays then made their first trip to Camden Yards to take on the Baltimore Orioles. Josh Donaldson's late-game grand slam gave the Blue Jays a 7–1 win. The game's paid attendance of 7,915 was the lowest in Orioles history, aside from the game played to an empty stadium during the 2015 riots. Aaron Sanchez took a no-hitter into the seventh inning of the second game, as the Jays edged the Orioles 2–1 thanks to a late home run by Curtis Granderson. Baltimore took the final game of the series, 5–3. To close the season's first road trip, the Blue Jays traveled to Cleveland, to take on the Indians. Prior to the first game, Toronto placed Josh Donaldson on the disabled list. The Jays went down 4–0 through two innings in the first game, before scoring eight unanswered runs to take the game 8–4. The other two scheduled games of the series were rained out, and postponed to May 3 for a doubleheader.

Returning home for a brief, three-game series against the Kansas City Royals, the Blue Jays experienced just their second postponement since moving to the Rogers Centre in 1989. A section of ice, formed during a weekend freezing rain storm, fell from the CN Tower and pierced the roof of the stadium, forcing the team to schedule a doubleheader for the following day due to safety concerns. A six-run sixth inning in the first game cemented the win for the Jays, while backup catcher Luke Maile's walk-off single in the tenth inning of the second game gave Toronto the rare home doubleheader sweep, by scores of 11–3 and 5–4. The Blue Jays would complete the series sweep with a 15–5 win on April 18, led by Curtis Granderson's ninth-career grand slam. The team then returned to the road for four games against the Yankees. They would split the first two games of the series, with the Yankees winning the first 4–3 and the Jays taking the second 8–5. New York would hold the Blue Jays to a single run in each of the next two games, taking the series with 9–1 and 5–1 victories.

May 
The Blue Jays struggled through a generally mediocre month of May. Reasons for their struggles throughout the month were generally attributed to the Blue Jays having lost Osuna to administrative leave following accusations of domestic violence, the suspension of Osuna for 75 games for that offence, and injuries to several key players such as Josh Donaldson. For the first time since the month of May 1979, the team failed to win back-to-back games for the entire month.

The team posted their lowest monthly winning percentage of the season in the month of May (.322) after winning just nine games while losing nineteen. A significant detriment to the team's record was being swept twice during the month, first by the Boston Red Sox and then the Oakland Athletics, which added seven losses without any wins. The Blue Jays began their season with a three-game series against the Minnesota Twins at their home stadium, Rogers Centre, which they won two games to one behind their strong offensive performance, scoring fourteen runs over the series. The team travelled to face the Cleveland Indians in two make-up games, which were postponed after rain and inclement weather forced a postponement of the games that were originally scheduled for April 14 and April 15. They won the first game in extra innings 13-11 after they scored four runs in the eleventh inning, but lost the second game 4-13 after the Indians were able to score nine runs in a single inning.

Over each of the next three consecutive three-game series, where they played against Tampa Bay Rays, Seattle Mariners, and Boston Red Sox, the Blue Jays posted the same losing record of 1-2. In the first series against Tampa Bay at Tropicana Field, they lost the first two games by a combined five runs to eleven behind a strong pitching performance from the Rays. They won the third and final game of the series 2-1, only after a wild pitch in the ninth inning allowed the winning run to score. After having their first day off in two full weeks, the Blue Jays returned home to face the Mariners in a three-game series. They lost the first game 0-5, after pitcher James Paxton, a Canada native, threw a no-hitter to leave the Blue Jays without a hit or run over nine innings. They would win the next game 5-2, as the team got twelve hits to the Rays’ five; however, on the next night, the Rays would get seventeen hits to the Blue Jays’ eight in a 3–9 loss. The Blue Jays remained at home to play the Red Sox in a three-game series. They won the first game 5–3 in extra innings, as catcher Luke Maile hit two home runs, one to tie the game in the seventh inning, and one to win the game in the bottom of the twelfth inning. However, the team would lose the next two games behind strong pitching and hitting performances from the Red Sox.

After playing the last two series at home, the Blue Jays travelled to Citi Field to play the New York Mets in a two-game series. They lost the first game 2-12 behind a strong pitching and hitting performance from the Mets’ starting pitcher, Noah Syndergaard. However, they won the second game 12-1 as the team got fifteen hits, and their starting pitcher, J.A. Happ, only allowed two hits while striking out ten batters over seven innings. This would be the first time the Blue Jays would win against the Mets in an road game in franchise history. After their series against the Mets, the Blue Jays returned home to Rogers Centre to play a four-game series against the Oakland Athletics. Despite both teams having an even 22–22 record following the first game in the series, the Athletics would go on to sweep the Blue Jays. The team was limited to twelve total runs over the four losses, compared to the Athletics’ twenty-seven. This would be the second time, and not the last, that the team would lose four straight games in the 2018 season. After a day off, the Blue Jays remained at home to play a three-game series against the Los Angeles Angels. They snapped their four-game losing streak with a 5–3 win in the first game, where they scored all five runs in the first inning. However, they would go on to lose the next two games and the series. They were up 3–0 in the bottom of the fifth inning, but after the Angels scored four runs in the top of the ninth inning, the Blue Jays ended up losing 4-5. They would also lose the last game 1-8 behind a robust offensive performance from the Angels.

After losing eight of their last ten games, the Blue Jays travelled to Citizens Bank Park to play the Philadelphia Phillies in a three-game series. They won the first game 6-5 as the Blue Jays’ bullpen held on to win a game that the team was winning 6–1 in the bottom of the fifth inning. However, the team would go on to lose the next game 1-2 after two short rain delays and a strong pitching performance from the Phillies’ starter Aaron Nola. Behind an eight-strikeout pitching performance from their starter J.A. Happ, the Blue Jays won the final game of the series 5-3. This would be the first time in a month that the team would win a series. To complete a rather mediocre month of May, the Blue Jays would get swept by the Boston Red Sox in a three-game series at Fenway Park. They lost both the first and the second game 3-8, as the Red Sox offense was lethal throughout both games. They lost the final game in the series 4–6 to complete the sweep for Boston, as Red Sox outfielder J.D. Martinez hit his league-tying eighteenth home run. By the end of an unexceptional month of May, the Blue Jays would have a subpar 25-31 overall record, and would be fourteen games behind the first-place Boston Red Sox in the American League East Division.

June 
Coming off a below-average month of May, the Blue Jays would look to improve on their 25-31 overall record. Although they would lose the first two games in the month of June to the Detroit Tigers, the Blue Jays would go on to win fourteen games in June while losing twelve. June would be the last month of the regular season where the Blue Jays would post a winning record, and the only such month other than April, when the team posted a 15–10 record. In the first series of the month, the Blue Jays travelled to Comerica Park to play three games against the Detroit Tigers. They would lose the first two games as the Detroit offense scored twelve combined runs to the Blue Jays’ seven. They would win the next game 8-4 behind a strong performance by their starting pitcher Aaron Sanchez, breaking a five-game losing streak dating back to late May. After a day off, the Blue Jays returned home to play the New York Yankees at the Rogers Centre in a two-game series. They would lose both games after the high-powered offense of the Yankees put up ten combined runs to the Blue Jays’ two. This would not be the last time that the Blue Jays were swept in a series or shutout in a game during the month of June.

After losing eight out of their last ten games, the Blue Jays would go on to sweep the Baltimore Orioles in a four-game series at home, their first time being on the positive side of a sweep since the middle of April. They outscored the Orioles by a combined twenty-seven runs to eleven, including a thirteen-run win in the fourth and final game of the series. After winning their last four games, the Blue Jays would travel to Tropicana Field to play a three-game series against the Tampa Bay Rays. In their second series against the Rays this season, the Blue Jays would get swept, including a 1–0 shutout in the third and final game. After a day off to return home to Rogers Centre, the Blue Jays would face the Washington Nationals in a three-game series. They would go on to sweep the Nationals in three games, the second of which was as 2-0 shutout, behind strong offensive performances by their starting infielder Yangervis Solarte. After winning seven of their last ten games, the Blue Jays faced the Atlanta Braves in a two-game series at home. They lost the first game 4-11, as the Braves got fourteen hits while hitting two home runs; they would go on to win the second game 5-4 behind a strong performance from their starting pitcher J.A. Happ, who struck out eight batters over 8 1/3 innings.

The Blue Jays then travelled to Angel Stadium to face the Los Angeles Angels in a four-game series. The team would lose the first two games, 8-5 and 2-1, despite getting more tying or beating the Angels in hits both games. They would go on to win the next game 4-1, after scoring three runs in the top of the ninth inning. They would also win the following game 7–6 in extra innings, as designated hitter Kendrys Morales hit a pinch-hit home run in the top of the tenth inning. The Blue Jays then travelled to Minute Maid Park to face the Houston Astros in a three-game series. The team would win the first game 6-3, as starting outfielder Curtis Granderson hit two home runs. They would then go on to lose the next two games, the first of which was a 0–7 shutout behind a dominant performance from Astros’ starting pitcher Charlie Morton, and the second of which was a 6–7 loss as Astros’ starting infielder Alex Bregman hit a two-run walk-off home run to seal the comeback win. The final series of the month of June for the Blue Jays would be a four-game series against the Detroit Tigers at Rogers Centre. As the Blue Jays began the month with two losses to the Tigers, they ended the month with two wins against them. They won the first game 3-2 behind a stellar seven-inning performance from their starting pitcher Marcus Stroman. In their last final game of the month of June, the team won 4-3 as starting first baseman Justin Smoak hit a walk-off home run in the bottom of the ninth inning to seal the win. By the end of an adequate month of June, the Blue Jays would have a below-average 39-43 overall record, and would be sixteen games behind the first-place Boston Red Sox in the American League East Division.

July 
After a competent month of June where the team posted a 14–12 record, the Blue Jays would only worsen their 39-43 overall record. The team would post an abysmal 9–15 record in July, their second-worst winning percentage by month (.375), only after May. They would begin by the month by losing their first two games, which were the final two games of a four-game series at home with the Detroit Tigers that began in late June. They would lose by a combined 12-3 after a strong offensive performance from the Tigers’ starting outfielder Nick Castellanos in the first game, and an exceptional eight-inning performance from the Tigers’ starting pitcher Mike Fiers in the second game. The Blue Jays would then play the New York Mets in Rogers Centre in two-game series. They would win the first game 8-6, but then lose the next one 3-6. After a day off, the Blue Jays played the New York Yankees in a three-game series at home. They would win the first game 6-2 as starting first baseman Justin Smoak hit a three-run home run early, but would then lose the next two 5-8 and 1-2, respectively.

After playing three consecutive home series, the Blue Jays travelled to SunTrust Park to play the Atlanta Braves in a two-game series. The team would win the first game 6-2 as starting pitcher Marcus Stroman pitched six innings while only allowing one run. They would lose the second game 5-9 as the Braves scored six runs by the end of the second inning. The Blue Jays then travelled to Fenway Park to play the Boston Red Sox in a four-game series. The team would get its lone win in the series in the second game as they won 13-7, but would lose the other three games by a combined seventeen runs to eight. After a four-day break for the MLB Home Run Derby and All-Star Game, which only included one selection from the Blue Jays (J.A. Happ) and symbolically marks the halfway point in the regular season, the Blue Jays faced the Baltimore Orioles in a three-game series at Rogers Centre. Similarly to the last time the team played the Orioles in a series, the Blue Jays completed the sweep. They beat the Orioles in three close games, 8-7, 4-1, and 5-4.

Looking to improve on their three-game win streak, the Blue Jays faced the Minnesota Twins in a three-game series at home. The team would go on to lose their next three games, as the Twins completed the sweep. The second game was a 0–5 shutout as Twins’ starting pitcher Jose Berrios threw seven scoreless innings with nine strikeouts. After a day off, the Blue Jays travelled to Guaranteed Rate Field to play the Chicago White Sox in a three-game series. The Blue Jays would win the series two games to one, which would be the second and last winning series for the team in the month of July. The month of July would end in a similar way as it began for the Blue Jays, as they lost their final two games by a combined sixteen runs to three in a three-game series against the Oakland Athletics. By the end of a mediocre month of July, the Blue Jays would have a subpar 48-58 overall record, and would be a dispiriting 25 1/2 games behind the first-place Boston Red Sox in the American League East Division.

August 
After an inadequate month of July where the Blue Jays won only nine of their twenty-four games, the team would only perform slightly better in August. They would post a 13–15 record for the month, winning four more games than the previous month but still losing more than winning. The first game of August would be the third and final game of a three-game series against the Oakland Athletics that began in late July. The Blue Jays lost 3-8, and the Athletics were able to sweep to Blue Jays for the second time this season. The Blue Jays then travelled to T-Mobile Park to face the Seattle Mariners in a four-game series. After a three-game losing streak, the team won the next three games by a combined 19–6 to win the series, but then lost the fourth and final game 3-6. After three consecutive road series, the Blue Jays returned home to Rogers Centre to play the Boston Red Sox in a three-game series. They lost the first two games, as the Red Sox posted ten runs in both games while the Blue Jays scored seven and five, respectively, but then won the third and final game of the series 8-5. The team then faced the Tampa Bay Rays in a three-game series, but ended up losing the series two games to one as they only scored five runs to the Rays’ ten. They lost the first game as they were shutout 0-7, but won the third and final game 2-1.

After playing six games at home, the Blue Jays travelled to Kauffman Stadium to face the Kansas City Royals in a four-game series. They lost the first game 1-3 as Royals’ starting pitcher Brad Keller threw seven innings only allowing one run. They won the next two games by the same score, 6-5. The team lost the fourth and final game of the series 2-6, as they scored two runs in the first four innings and did not score again. They then travelled to Yankee Stadium to play a three-game series against the New York Yankees. The Blue Jays were swept as the Yankees offense remained strong throughout the series, scoring twenty-eight runs to the Blue Jays’ thirteen. In the final game, J.A. Happ received the win as starting pitcher for the Yankees against his former team, as he was traded from the Blue Jays to the Yankees for an infielder Brandon Drury and outfielder Billy McKinney in the previous month. After being on the negative side of a sweep, the Blue Jays would go on to sweep the Baltimore Orioles in a three-game series at home at Rogers Centre. They outscored the Orioles by a combined nineteen runs to five, including a shutout in the third and final game of the series.

The Blue Jays looked to improve on their three-game win streak as they faced the Philadelphia Phillies in a three-game series at home. They would win the first two games, 4-2 and 8-6, respectively, and extend their win streak to five games, but would go on to lose the third and final game of the series, 3-8. The team then travelled to Oriole Park to play the Baltimore Orioles in a three-game series. Only a week after the Blue Jays’ last series against the Orioles where they completed the sweep, the Blue Jays were on the losing side of a sweep, as they lost their next three consecutive games to the Orioles. The first game of the series was a 0–7 shutout; the Orioles did not score fewer than seven runs in any of the three games. After a day off, the team travelled to Marlins Park to face the Miami Marlins in a three-game series. The final game of August for the Blue Jays was a 6–5 win against the Marlins to start the series, as the Blue Jays scored five runs in the top of the ninth inning to complete the comeback. By the end of a disappointing month of August, the Blue Jays would have a below-average 61-73 overall record, and would be a discouraging 31 games behind the first-place Boston Red Sox in the American League East Division.

September 
After an insufficient month of August, as the Blue Jays were swept twice and won thirteen games out of a possible twenty-eight, the team's hopes for making the postseason were in jeopardy as the final month of the regular season began. The team would perform worse in September than they did in the previous month, as they would post a 12–16 record for the month, and be eliminated from playoff contention in early September. The first two games of the month of September were the final two games of a three-game series against the Miami Marlins that had begun the previous day in August. The Blue Jays would lose the second game of the series 3-6, but win the third game 6-1, as starting pitcher Sean Reid-Foley pitched seven innings with ten strikeouts. The Blue Jays then returned home to Rogers Centre to play the Tampa Bay Rays in a three-game series. Although they lost the first two games, by a score of 1-7 and 0-4, respectively, they won the third and final game of the series 10-3, after scoring seven runs in the bottom of the first inning.

The Blue Jays remained at home to play a four-game series against the Cleveland Indians. They alternated games with the Indians, losing the first 4-9, winning the second 3-2, losing the third 8-9, and winning the final game 6-2. Following the 8–9 loss in the third game of the series, the Blue Jays were mathematically eliminated from playoff contention. After a day off, the team travelled to Fenway Park to face the Boston Red Sox in a three-game series. For the ninth and final time, the Blue Jays were swept. The Red Sox outscored the Blue Jays twelve runs to five during the three-game series. After losing to the best team in their division in the Red Sox, the Blue Jays travelled to Yankee Stadium to play a three-game series against the second-best team in the American League East, the New York Yankees. They would be shutout in the first game 0-11, but would win the final two games 8-7 and 3-2, respectively. The team would then travel to Orioles Park to play the Baltimore Orioles in a three-game series. They would shutout the Orioles in the first game 5-0, win the second game 6-4, and lose 1–2 in the final game of the series.

After playing three consecutive three-game series on the road, the Blue Jays returned home to Rogers Centre to play a four-game series against the Tampa Bay Rays. They would alternate games with the Rays, winning the first game 9-8, losing the second 3-11, winning the third 5-2, and losing the final game 2-5. For their final home series of the regular season, the Blue Jays played the Houston Astros in a three-game series. They would lose the first two games, 3-5 and 1-4, respectively, but would win their final home game of the regular season 3-1. For their final series of the regular season, the Blue Jays travelled to Tropicana Field to face the Tampa Bay Rays in a three-game series to complete the regular season. This series would mark the third meeting of these teams in the month of September, and the final game for both teams for the 2018 season, as neither team would reach the postseason. The Blue Jays would receive their final win of the season in the first game of the series, as they won 7-6. They would go on to lose the final two games of the series, and the season, 3-4 and 4-9, respectively.

By the end of the month of September, the MLB regular season ended, and the season formally concluded for the Blue Jays. The team finished with a below-average 73-89 overall record, did not reach the postseason, and were 35 games behind the Boston Red Sox, who would go on to win the American League East division title, and the 2018 World Series championship.

Game log

|-  style="text-align:center; background:#fbb;"
| 1 || March 29 || Yankees || 1–6 || Severino (1–0) || Happ (0–1) || — || 48,115 || 0–1 || 1
|-  style="text-align:center; background:#fbb;"
| 2 || March 30 || Yankees || 2–4 || Tanaka (1–0) || Sanchez (0–1) || Chapman (1) || 33,716 || 0–2 || 2
|-  style="text-align:center; background:#bfb;"
| 3 || March 31 || Yankees || 5–3 || Tepera (1–0) || Betances (0–1) || Osuna (1) || 37,692 || 1–2 || 1
|-

|-  style="text-align:center; background:#bfb;"
| 4 || April 1 || Yankees || 7–4 || Clippard (1–0) || Robertson (0–1) || Oh (1) || 29,091 || 2–2 || 1
|-  style="text-align:center; background:#bfb;"
| 5 || April 2 || White Sox || 4–2 || Oh (1–0) || Farquhar (1–1) || Osuna (2) || 16,629 || 3–2 || 1
|-  style="text-align:center; background:#bfb;"
| 6 || April 3 || White Sox || 14–5 || Happ (1–1) || González (0–1) || — || 17,451 || 4–2 || 1
|-  style="text-align:center; background:#fbb;"
| 7 || April 4 || White Sox || 3–4 || Jones (1–0) || Tepera (1–1) || Soria (2) || 17,268 || 4–3 || 1½
|-  style="text-align:center; background:#bfb;"
| 8 || April 6 || @ Rangers || 8–5 || Estrada (1–0) || Moore (0–2) || Osuna (3) || 21,670 || 5–3 || 1½
|-  style="text-align:center; background:#fbb;"
| 9 || April 7 || @ Rangers || 1–5 || Minor (1–1) || Stroman (0–1) || — || 26,229 || 5–4 || 2½
|-  style="text-align:center; background:#bfb;"
| 10 || April 8 || @ Rangers || 7–4 || García (1–0) || Hamels (1–2) || Osuna (4) || 26,902 || 6–4 || 2½
|-  style="text-align:center; background:#bfb;"
| 11 || April 9 || @ Orioles || 7–1 || Happ (2–1) || Bundy (0–1) || — || 7,915 || 7–4 || 2
|-  style="text-align:center; background:#bfb;"
| 12 || April 10 || @ Orioles || 2–1 || Sanchez (1–1) || O'Day (0–1) || Osuna (5) || 8,640 || 8–4 || 2
|-  style="text-align:center; background:#fbb;"
| 13 || April 11 || @ Orioles || 3–5 || Gausman (1–1) || Estrada (1–1) || Brach (3) || 10,399 || 8–5 || 2
|-  style="text-align:center; background:#bfb;"
| 14 || April 13 || @ Indians || 8–4 || Barnes (1–0) || McAllister (0–2) || — || 25,592 || 9–5 || 2½
|-  style="text-align:center; background:#ccc;"
| – || April 14 || @ Indians ||colspan="7" | Postponed (rain). Makeup date: May 3.
|-  style="text-align:center; background:#ccc;"
| – || April 15 || @ Indians ||colspan="7" | Postponed (rain). Makeup date: May 3.
|-  style="text-align:center; background:#ccc;"
| – || April 16 || Royals ||colspan="7" | Postponed (roof damage). Makeup date: April 17.
|-  style="text-align:center; background:#bfb;"
| 15 || April 17 || Royals || 11–3 || García (2–0) || Skoglund (0–2) || — || 18,645 || 10–5 || 3
|-  style="text-align:center; background:#bfb;"
| 16 || April 17 || Royals || 5–4 (10) || Clippard (2–0) || Flynn (0–1) || — || 18,645 || 11–5 || 3
|-  style="text-align:center; background:#bfb;"
| 17 || April 18 || Royals || 15–5 || Happ (3–1) || Kennedy (1–2) || — || 28,803 || 12–5 || 3
|-  style="text-align:center; background:#fbb;"
| 18 || April 19 || @ Yankees || 3–4 || Green (1–0) || Sanchez (1–2) || Chapman (3) || 36,665 || 12–6 || 4
|-  style="text-align:center; background:#bfb;"
| 19 || April 20 || @ Yankees || 8–5 || Estrada (2–1) || Germán (0–1) || Osuna (6) || 39,197 || 13–6 || 4
|-  style="text-align:center; background:#fbb;"
| 20 || April 21 || @ Yankees || 1–9 || Montgomery (2–0) || Stroman (0–2) || — || 40,986 || 13–7 || 4
|-  style="text-align:center; background:#fbb;"
| 21 || April 22 || @ Yankees || 1–5 || Severino (4–1) || García (2–1) || — || 43,628 || 13–8 || 4
|-  style="text-align:center; background:#bfb;"
| 22 || April 24 || Red Sox || 4–3 (10) || Clippard (3–0) || Kimbrel (0–1) || — || 20,070 || 14–8 || 3 
|-  style="text-align:center; background:#fbb;"
| 23 || April 25 || Red Sox || 3–4 || Rodríguez (3–0) || Barnes (1–1) || Kimbrel (6) || 18,914 || 14–9 || 4
|-  style="text-align:center; background:#fbb;"
| 24 || April 26 || Red Sox || 4–5 || Sale (2–1) || Estrada (2–2) || Kimbrel (7) || 23,571 || 14–10 || 5
|-  style="text-align:center; background:#fbb;"
| 25 || April 27 || Rangers || 4–6 || Minor (2–1) || Stroman (0–3) || Kela (5) || 26,312 || 14–11 || 5
|-  style="text-align:center; background:#fbb;"
| 26 || April 28 || Rangers || 4–7 || Colón (1–0) || García (2–2) || Kela (6) || 39,176 || 14–12 || 5 
|-  style="text-align:center; background:#bfb;"
| 27 || April 29 || Rangers || 7–2 || Happ (4–1) || Pérez (2–3) || — || 31,669 || 15–12 || 5
|-  style="text-align:center; background:#bfb;"
| 28 || April 30 || @ Twins || 7–5 || Sanchez (2–2) || Lynn (0–3) || Osuna (7) || 16,456 || 16–12 || 5
|-

|-  style="text-align:center; background:#bfb;"
| 29 || May 1 || @ Twins || 7–4 (10) || Clippard (4–0) || Curtiss (0–1) || Osuna (8) || 16,245 || 17–12 || 4
|-  style="text-align:center; background:#fbb;"
| 30 || May 2 || @ Twins || 0–4 || Romero (1–0) || Stroman (0–4) || — || 16,420 || 17–13 || 5
|-  style="text-align:center; background:#bfb;"
| 31 || May 3 || @ Indians || 13–11 (11) || Mayza (1–0) || Olson (0–1) || — || 19,007 || 18–13 || 4½
|-  style="text-align:center; background:#fbb;"
| 32 || May 3 || @ Indians || 4–13 || Plutko (1–0) || Biagini (0–1) || — || 19,007 || 18–14 || 4½
|-  style="text-align:center; background:#fbb;"
| 33 || May 4 || @ Rays || 2–6 || Yarbrough (2–1) || Happ (4–2) || — || 11,117 || 18–15 || 5½
|-  style="text-align:center; background:#fbb;"
| 34 || May 5 || @ Rays || 3–5 || Faria (3–1) || Sanchez (2–3) || Colomé (6) || 16,297 || 18–16 || 6½
|-  style="text-align:center; background:#bfb;"
| 35 || May 6 || @ Rays || 2–1 || Tepera (2–1) || Colomé (2–4) || Osuna (9) || 14,032 || 19–16 || 6½
|-  style="text-align:center; background:#fbb;"
| 36 || May 8 || Mariners || 0–5 || Paxton (2–1) || Stroman (0–5) || — || 20,513 || 19–17 || 6½
|-  style="text-align:center; background:#bfb;"
| 37 || May 9 || Mariners || 5–2 || Tepera (3–1) || Nicasio (1–1) || Clippard (1) || 20,290 || 20–17 || 6½
|-  style="text-align:center; background:#fbb;"
| 38 || May 10 || Mariners || 3–9 || Leake (4–3) || Happ (4–3) || — || 22,315 || 20–18 || 6½
|-  style="text-align:center; background:#bfb;"
| 39 || May 11 || Red Sox || 5–3 (12) || Gaviglio (1–0) || Johnson (1–2) || — || 28,695 || 21–18 || 5½
|-  style="text-align:center; background:#fbb;"
| 40 || May 12 || Red Sox || 2–5 || Price (3–4) || Estrada (2–3) || Kimbrel (11) || 37,588 || 21–19 || 6½
|-  style="text-align:center; background:#fbb;"
| 41 || May 13 || Red Sox || 3–5 || Velázquez (5–0) || Biagini (0–2) || Kelly (2) || 37,888 || 21–20 || 7½
|-  style="text-align:center; background:#fbb;"
| 42 || May 15 || @ Mets || 2–12 || Syndergaard (3–1) || García (2–3) || – || 28,967 || 21–21 || 8
|-  style="text-align:center; background:#bfb;"
| 43 || May 16 || @ Mets || 12–1 || Happ (5–3) || Wheeler (2–3) || — || 28,400 || 22–21 || 7½
|-  style="text-align:center; background:#fbb;"
| 44 || May 17 || Athletics || 5–10 || Petit (1–0) || Sanchez (2–4) || — || 22,893 || 22–22 || 8
|-  style="text-align:center; background:#fbb;"
| 45 || May 18 || Athletics || 1–3 || Coulombe (1–1) || Estrada (2–4) || Treinen (9) || 21,703 || 22–23 || 8
|-  style="text-align:center; background:#fbb;"
| 46 || May 19 || Athletics || 4–5 || Pagán (1–0) || Clippard (4–1) || Treinen (10) || 35,786 || 22–24 || 9 
|-  style="text-align:center; background:#fbb;"
| 47 || May 20 || Athletics || 2–9 || Mengden (4–4) || Biagini (0–3)|| || 30,676 || 22–25 || 10
|-  style="text-align:center; background:#bfb;"
| 48 || May 22 || Angels || 5–3 || Happ (6–3) || Richards (4–3) || Clippard (2) || 21,480 || 23–25 || 10
|-  style="text-align:center; background:#fbb;"
| 49 || May 23 || Angels || 4–5 || Anderson (1–1) || Clippard (4–2) || Parker (3) || 25,504 || 23–26 || 11
|-  style="text-align:center; background:#fbb;"
| 50 || May 24 || Angels || 1–8 || Tropeano (2–3) || Estrada (2–5) || — || 43,344 || 23–27 || 11
|-  style="text-align:center; background:#bfb;"
| 51 || May 25 || @ Phillies || 6–5 || Gaviglio (2–0) || Eflin (1–1) || Tepera (1) || 21,374 || 24–27 || 11
|-  style="text-align:center; background:#fbb;"
| 52 || May 26 || @ Phillies || 1–2 || Domínguez (1–0) || Biagini (0–4) || García (1) || 26,788 || 24–28 || 12
|-  style="text-align:center; background:#bfb;"
| 53 || May 27 || @ Phillies || 5–3 || Happ (7–3) || Pivetta (4–3) || Tepera (2) || 24,182 || 25–28 || 11 
|-  style="text-align:center; background:#fbb;"
| 54 || May 28 || @ Red Sox || 3–8 || Price (5–4) || Sanchez (2–5) || — || 34,700 || 25–29 || 12 
|-  style="text-align:center; background:#fbb;"
| 55 || May 29 || @ Red Sox || 3–8 || Porcello (7–2) || Estrada (2–6) || Kimbrel (17) || 33,380 || 25–30 || 13 
|-  style="text-align:center; background:#fbb;"
| 56 || May 30 || @ Red Sox || 4–6 || Rodríguez (6–1) || Gaviglio (2–1) || Kimbrel (18) || 33,451 || 25–31 || 14 
|-

|-  style="text-align:center; background:#fbb;"
| 57 || June 1 || @  Tigers || 2–5 || Hardy (2–0) || García (2–4) || Greene (14) || 22,192 || 25–32 || 13½
|-  style="text-align:center; background:#fbb;"
| 58 || June 2 || @ Tigers || 4–7 || Coleman (3–0) || Oh (1–1) || Jiménez (1) || 34,674 || 25–33 || 14½
|-  style="text-align:center; background:#bfb;"
| 59 || June 3 || @ Tigers || 8–4 || Sanchez (3–5) || Fulmer (2–5) || — || 24,658 || 26–33 || 14½
|-  style="text-align:center; background:#fbb;"
| 60 || June 5 || Yankees || 2–7 || Sabathia (3–1) || Oh (1–2) || — || 29,308 || 26–34 || 15½  
|-  style="text-align:center; background:#fbb;"
| 61 || June 6 || Yankees || 0–3 (13) || Robertson (4–2) || Biagini (0–5) || Chapman (15) || 27,838 || 26–35 || 16½
|-  style="text-align:center; background:#bfb;"
| 62 || June 7 || Orioles || 5–4 (10) || Barnes (2–1) || Castro (1–2) || — || 24,494 || 27–35 || 15½
|-  style="text-align:center; background:#bfb;"
| 63 || June 8 || Orioles || 5–1 || Happ (8–3) || Cashner (2–8) || Tepera (3) || 28,863 || 28–35 || 15  
|-  style="text-align:center; background:#bfb;"
| 64 || June 9 || Orioles || 4–3 (10) || Axford (1–0) || Givens (0–2) || – || 34,643  || 29–35 || 15
|-  style="text-align:center; background:#bfb;"
| 65 || June 10 || Orioles || 13–3 || Estrada (3–6) || Cobb (2–8) || — || 33,485 || 30–35 || 14
|-  style="text-align:center; background:#fbb;"
| 66 || June 11 || @ Rays || 4–8 || Yarbrough (5–2) || Gaviglio (2–2) || — || 10,769 || 30–36 || 14½
|-  style="text-align:center; background:#fbb;"
| 67 || June 12 || @ Rays || 1–4 || Pruitt (2–3) || García (2–5) || Romo (2) || 11,162 || 30–37 || 15½
|-  style="text-align:center; background:#fbb;"
| 68 || June 13 || @ Rays || 0–1 || Castillo (1–0) || Tepera (3–2) || — || 10,847 || 30–38 || 16½
|-  style="text-align:center; background:#bfb;"
| 69 || June 15 || Nationals || 6–5 || Oh (2–2) || González (6–3) || Tepera (4) || 29,633 || 31–38 || 16
|-  style="text-align:center; background:#bfb;"
| 70 || June 16 || Nationals || 2–0 || Estrada (4–6) || Scherzer (10–3) || Clippard (3) || 36,044 || 32–38 || 16 
|-  style="text-align:center; background:#bfb;"
| 71 || June 17 || Nationals || 8–6 || Tepera (4–2) || Madson (1–3) || — || 35,146 || 33–38 || 15
|-  style="text-align:center; background:#fbb;"
| 72 || June 19 || Braves || 4–11 || Freeman (2–3) || García (2–6) || — || 32,466 || 33–39 || 16 
|-  style="text-align:center; background:#bfb;"
| 73 || June 20 || Braves || 5–4 || Happ (9–3) || Sánchez (3–1) || Tepera (5) || 45,563 || 34–39 || 16 
|-  style="text-align:center; background:#fbb;"
| 74 || June 21 || @ Angels || 5–8 || Ramirez (3–3) || Axford (1–1)|| Anderson (3) || 30,416 || 34–40 || 17  
|-  style="text-align:center; background:#fbb;"
| 75 || June 22 || @ Angels || 1–2 || Heaney (4–5) || Estrada (4–7) ||Parker (9) || 38,028 || 34–41 || 17
|-  style="text-align:center; background:#bfb;"
| 76 || June 23 || @ Angels || 4–1 || Oh (3–2) || Anderson (1–2) || Tepera (6) || 40,612 || 35–41 || 16
|-  style="text-align:center; background:#bfb;"
| 77 || June 24 || @ Angels || 7–6 (10) || Tepera (5–2) || Robles (2–3) || Clippard (4) || 33,102 || 36–41 || 15
|-  style="text-align:center; background:#bfb;"
| 78 || June 25 || @ Astros || 6–3 || Happ (10–3) || Verlander (9–3) || Oh (2) || 28,791 || 37–41 || 15
|-  style="text-align:center; background:#fbb;"
| 79 || June 26 || @ Astros || 0–7 || Morton (10–1) || Borucki (0–1) || — || 38,700 || 37–42 || 16
|-  style="text-align:center; background:#fbb;"
| 80 || June 27 || @ Astros || 6–7 || Harris (3–3) || Tepera (5–3) || — || 39,191 || 37–43 || 16½
|-  style="text-align:center; background:#bfb;"
| 81 || June 29 || Tigers || 3–2 || Stroman (1–5) || Liriano (3–4) || Clippard (5) || 24,068 || 38–43 || 16
|-  style="text-align:center; background:#bfb;"
| 82 || June 30 || Tigers || 4–3 || Oh (4–2) || Jiménez (3–1) || — || 27,066 || 39–43 || 16
|-

|-  style="text-align:center; background:#fbb;"
| 83 || July 1 || Tigers || 1–9 || Zimmermann (3–0) || Happ (10–4) || — || 37,445 || 39–44 || 16
|-  style="text-align:center; background:#fbb;"
| 84 || July 2 || Tigers || 2–3 (10) ||  Jiménez (4–1) || Oh (4–3) || Hardy (1) || 29,575 || 39–45 || 17
|-  style="text-align:center; background:#bfb;"
| 85 || July 3 || Mets || 8–6 || Axford (2–1) || Peterson (1–1) || Clippard (6) || 24,010 || 40–45 || 17
|-  style="text-align:center; background:#fbb;"
| 86 || July 4 || Mets || 3–6 || Lugo (3–3) || Stroman (1–6) || Familia (16) || 26,038 || 40–46 || 18
|-  style="text-align:center; background:#bfb;"
| 87 || July 6 || Yankees || 6–2 || Biagini (1–5) || Gray (5–7) || — || 37,254 || 41–46 || 18
|-  style="text-align:center; background:#fbb;"
| 88 || July 7 || Yankees || 5–8 || Severino (14–2) || Happ (10–5) || — || 44,352 || 41–47 || 19
|-  style="text-align:center; background:#fbb;"
| 89 || July 8 || Yankees || 1–2 (10) || Green (5–1) || Clippard (4–3) || Robertson (2) || 39,866 || 41–48 || 20
|-  style="text-align:center; background:#bfb;"
| 90 || July 10 || @ Braves || 6–2 || Stroman (2–6) || Minter (3–2) || — || 31,747 || 42–48 || 20½
|-  style="text-align:center; background:#fbb;"
| 91 || July 11 || @ Braves || 5–9 || Foltynewicz (7–5) || Gaviglio (2–3) || — || 27,839 || 42–49 || 21½
|-  style="text-align:center; background:#fbb;"
| 92 || July 12 || @ Red Sox || 4–6 || Price (10–6) || Happ (10–6) || Kimbrel (29) || 37,182 || 42–50 || 22½
|-  style="text-align:center; background:#bfb;"
| 93 || July 13 || @ Red Sox || 13–7 || Petricka (1–0) || Porcello (11–4) || — || 37,018 || 43–50 || 21½
|-  style="text-align:center; background:#fbb;"
| 94 || July 14 || @ Red Sox || 2–6 (10) || Kimbrel (2–1) || Rowley (0–1) || — || 36,390 || 43–51 || 22½
|-  style="text-align:center; background:#fbb;"
| 95 || July 15 || @ Red Sox || 2–5 || Workman (2–0) || Stroman (2–7) || Kimbrel (30) || 36,940 || 43–52 || 23½
|-  style="text-align:center; background:#bfb;"
| 96 || July 20 || Orioles || 8–7 (10) || Axford (3–1) || Fry (0–1) || — || 31,115 || 44–52 || 23½
|-  style="text-align:center; background:#bfb;"
| 97 || July 21 || Orioles || 4–1 || Stroman (3–7) || Cobb (2–13) || Tepera (7) || 35,912 || 45–52 || 22½
|-  style="text-align:center; background:#bfb;"
| 98 || July 22 || Orioles || 5–4 || Axford (4–1) || Scott (1–2) || Clippard (7) || 39,021 || 46–52 || 22½
|-  style="text-align:center; background:#fbb;"
| 99 || July 23 || Twins || 3–8 || Mejía (1–0) || Santos (0–1) || — || 25,405 || 46–53 || 23½ 
|-  style="text-align:center; background:#fbb;"
| 100 || July 24 || Twins || 0–5 || Berríos (10–7) || Borucki (0–2) || — || 31,933 || 46–54 || 23½
|-  style="text-align:center; background:#fbb;"
| 101 || July 25 || Twins || 6–12 (11) || Belisle (1–0) || Petricka (1–1) || — || 32,686 || 46–55 || 23½
|-  style="text-align:center; background:#bfb;"
| 102 || July 27 || @ White Sox || 10–5 || Stroman (4–7) || López (4–9) || — || 20,524 || 47–55 || 23½
|-  style="text-align:center; background:#fbb;"
| 103 || July 28 || @ White Sox || 5–9 || Minaya (1–2) || Tepera (5–4) || — || 29,442 || 47–56 || 24½ 
|-  style="text-align:center; background:#bfb;"
| 104 || July 29 || @ White Sox || 7–4 || Santos (1–1) || Fry (0–2) || — || 23,836 || 48–56 || 24½
|-  style="text-align:center; background:#fbb;"
| 105 || July 30 || @ Athletics || 1–10 || Jackson (2–2) || Estrada (4–8) || — || 11,449 || 48–57 || 25½ 
|-  style="text-align:center; background:#fbb;"
| 106 || July 31 || @ Athletics || 2–6 || Cahill (3–2) || Gaviglio (2–4) || — || 17,325 || 48–58 || 25½ 
|-

|-  style="text-align:center; background:#fbb;"
| 107 || August 1 || @ Athletics || 3–8 || Manaea (10–7) || Stroman (4–8) || — || 17,058 || 48–59 || 26
|-  style="text-align:center; background:#bfb;"
| 108 || August 2 || @ Mariners || 7–3 || Hauschild (1–0) || Nicasio (1–6) || — || 26,110 || 49–59 || 26 
|-  style="text-align:center; background:#bfb;"
| 109 || August 3 || @ Mariners || 7–2 || Borucki (1–2) || Gonzales (12–6) || — || 30,715 || 50–59 || 26  
|-  style="text-align:center; background:#bfb;"
| 110 || August 4 || @ Mariners || 5–1 || Estrada (5–8) || Paxton (9–5) || — || 41,238 || 51–59 || 26
|-  style="text-align:center; background:#fbb;"
| 111 || August 5 || @ Mariners || 3–6 || Duke (4–4) || Biagini (1–6) || Díaz (41) || 40,515 || 51–60 || 27
|-  style="text-align:center; background:#fbb;"
| 112 || August 7 || Red Sox || 7–10 (10) || Kimbrel (3–1) || Giles (0–3) || — || 31,855 || 51–61 || 28
|-  style="text-align:center; background:#fbb;"
| 113 || August 8 || Red Sox || 5–10 || Johnson (3–3) || Hauschild (1–1) || — || 36,798 || 51–62 || 29 
|-  style="text-align:center; background:#bfb;"
| 114 || August 9 || Red Sox || 8–5 || Borucki (2–2) || Porcello (14–5) || — || 28,415 || 52–62 || 28 
|-  style="text-align:center; background:#fbb;"
| 115 || August 10 || Rays || 0–7 || Snell (13–5) || Estrada (5–9) || — || 23,082 || 52–63 || 29
|-  style="text-align:center; background:#fbb;"
| 116 || August 11 || Rays || 1–3 || Castillo (3–2) || Gaviglio (2–5) || Romo (15) || 38,797 || 52–64 || 30½
|-  style="text-align:center; background:#bfb;"
| 117 || August 12 || Rays || 2–1 || García (3–6) || Alvarado (1–5) || Giles (13) || 33,746 || 53–64 || 30½
|-  style="text-align:center; background:#fbb;"
| 118 || August 13 || @ Royals || 1–3 || Kelley (5–5) || Reid-Foley (0–1) || Peralta (7) || 14,721 || 53–65 || 31
|-  style="text-align:center; background:#bfb;"
| 119 || August 14 || @ Royals || 6–5 || Petricka (2–1) || Boyer (2–1) || Giles (14) || 13,680 || 54–65 || 31
|-  style="text-align:center; background:#bfb;" 
| 120 || August 15 || @ Royals || 6–5 || Estrada (6–9) || López (0–2) || Giles (15) || 14,391 || 55–65 || 30
|-  style="text-align:center; background:#fbb;"
| 121 || August 16 || @ Royals || 2–6 || Flynn (3–3) || Gaviglio (2–6) || — || 14,894 || 55–66 || 30½
|-  style="text-align:center; background:#fbb;"
| 122 || August 17 || @ Yankees || 5–7  (7)  || Green (6–2) || Biagini (1–7) || Robertson (3) || 42,121|| 55–67 || 31½ 
|-  style="text-align:center; background:#fbb;"
| 123 || August 18 || @ Yankees || 6–11 || Severino (16–6) || Reid-Foley (0–2) || — || 44,778 || 55–68 || 32½
|-  style="text-align:center; background:#fbb;"
| 124 || August 19 || @ Yankees || 2–10 || Happ (14–6) || Borucki (2–3) || — || 43,176 || 55–69 || 32½
|-  style="text-align:center; background:#bfb;"
| 125 || August 20 || Orioles || 5–3 || Estrada (7–9) || Cashner (4–11) || Giles (16) || 25,031 || 56–69 || 31½
|-  style="text-align:center; background:#bfb;"
| 126 || August 21 || Orioles || 8–2 || Gaviglio (3–6) || Bundy (7–12) || — || 25,855 || 57–69 || 30½
|-  style="text-align:center; background:#bfb;"
| 127 || August 22 || Orioles || 6–0 || Pannone (1–0) || Hess (2–8) || — || 40,595 || 58–69 || 30½
|-  style="text-align:center; background:#bfb;"
| 128 || August 24 || Phillies || 4–2 || Borucki (3–3) || Arrieta (9–9) || Giles (17) || 26,292 || 59–69 || 30
|-  style="text-align:center; background:#bfb;"
| 129 || August 25 || Phillies || 8–6 || Biagini (2–7) || Domínguez (1–5) || Giles (18) || 33,127 || 60–69 || 29
|-  style="text-align:center; background:#fbb;"
| 130 || August 26 || Phillies || 3–8 || Velasquez (9–9) || Estrada (7–10) || — || 28,209 || 60–70 || 29
|-  style="text-align:center; background:#fbb;"
| 131 || August 27 || @ Orioles || 0–7 || Hess (3–8) || Gaviglio (3–7) || — || 15,436 || 60–71 || 29½
|-  style="text-align:center; background:#fbb;"
| 132 || August 28 || @ Orioles || 5–12 || Rogers (1–0) || Pannone (1–1) || — || 11,762 || 60–72 || 30½
|-  style="text-align:center; background:#fbb;"
| 133 || August 29 || @ Orioles || 5–10 || Gilmartin (1–0) || Barnes (2–2) || Givens (5) || 11,834 || 60–73 || 31½
|-  style="text-align:center; background:#bfb;"
| 134 || August 31 || @ Marlins || 6–5 ||Biagini (3–7) || Steckenrider (4–4) || Giles (19) || 8,871 || 61–73 || 31
|-

|-  style="text-align:center; background:#fbb;"
| 135 || September 1 || @ Marlins || 3–6 || Chen (6–9) || Estrada (7–11) || — || 11,174 || 61–74 || 32
|-  style="text-align:center; background:#bfb;"
| 136 || September 2 || @ Marlins || 6–1 || Reid-Foley (1–2) || Brigham (0–1) || — || 9,617 || 62–74 || 31
|-  style="text-align:center; background:#fbb;"
| 137 || September 3 || Rays || 1–7 || Chirinos (3–5) || Stroman (4–9) || — || 18,034 || 62–75 || 32
|-  style="text-align:center; background:#fbb;"
| 138 || September 4 || Rays || 0–4 || Wood (1–1) || Borucki (3–4) || Romo (19) || 17,594 || 62–76 || 33
|-  style="text-align:center; background:#bfb;"
| 139 || September 5 || Rays || 10–3 || Sanchez (4–5) || Glasnow (1–5) || — || 17,872 || 63–76 || 33
|-  style="text-align:center; background:#fbb;"
| 140 || September 6 || Indians || 4–9 || Bieber (9–3) || Gaviglio (3–8) || — || 20,618 || 63–77 || 33½
|-  style="text-align:center; background:#bfb;"
| 141 || September 7 || Indians || 3–2 (11) || Barnes (3–2) || Cimber (3–6) || — || 26,830 || 64–77 || 32½
|-  style="text-align:center; background:#fbb;"
| 142 || September 8 || Indians || 8–9 || Tomlin (1–5) || Reid-Foley (1–3) || Allen (26) || 35,353 || 64–78 || 32½
|-  style="text-align:center; background:#bfb;"
| 143 || September 9 || Indians || 6–2 || Pannone (2–1) || Clevinger (11–8) || Giles (20) || 31,184 || 65–78 || 32½
|-  style="text-align:center; background:#fbb;"
| 144 || September 11 || @ Red Sox || 2–7 || Brasier (2–0) || Tepera (5–5) || — || 34,747 || 65–79 || 33½
|-  style="text-align:center; background:#fbb;"
| 145 || September 12 || @ Red Sox || 0–1 || Price (15–6) || Sanchez (4–6) || Kimbrel (39) || 35,178 || 65–80 || 34½
|-  style="text-align:center; background:#fbb;"
| 146 || September 13 || @ Red Sox || 3–4 || Workman (5–0) || Barnes (3–3) || Kimbrel (40) || 36,427 || 65–81 || 35½
|-  style="text-align:center; background:#fbb;"
| 147 || September 14 || @ Yankees || 0–11 || Tanaka (12–5) || Estrada (7–12) || Cessa (2) || 40,138 || 65–82 || 35½
|-  style="text-align:center; background:#bfb;"
| 148 || September 15 || @ Yankees || 8–7 || Reid-Foley (2–3) || Sabathia (7–7) || Giles (21) || 43,130 || 66–82 || 35½
|-  style="text-align:center; background:#bfb;"
| 149 || September 16 || @ Yankees || 3–2 || Pannone (3–1) || Betances (4–6) || Giles (22) || 41,758 || 67–82 || 35½
|-  style="text-align:center; background:#bfb;"
| 150 || September 17 || @ Orioles || 5–0 || Borucki (4–4) || Phillips (0–1) || — || 8,198 || 68–82 || 35
|-  style="text-align:center; background:#bfb;"
| 151 || September 18 || @ Orioles || 6–4 || Petricka (3–1) || Bundy (8–15) || Giles (23)  || 9,096 || 69–82 || 34
|-  style="text-align:center; background:#fbb;"
| 152 || September 19 || @ Orioles || 1–2 || Wright (3–2) || Estrada (7–13) || Givens (7) || 11,337 || 69–83 || 34
|-  style="text-align:center; background:#bfb;"
| 153 || September 20 || Rays || 9–8 || Paulino (1–0) || Romo (3–4) || — || 19,478 || 70–83 || 34
|-  style="text-align:center; background:#fbb;"
| 154 || September 21 || Rays || 3–11 || Beeks (5–1) || Reid-Foley (2–4) || Pruitt (3) || 21,167 || 70–84 || 35 
|-  style="text-align:center; background:#bfb;"
| 155 || September 22 || Rays || 5–2 || Pannone (4–1) || Glasnow (2–7) || Giles (24) || 27,648 || 71–84 || 34
|-  style="text-align:center; background:#fbb;"
| 156 || September 23 || Rays || 2–5 || Snell (21–5) || Borucki (4–5) || Romo (23) || 23,944 || 71–85 || 34
|-  style="text-align:center; background:#fbb;"
| 157 || September 24 || Astros || 3–5 || Keuchel (12–11) || Estrada (7–14) || Osuna (19) || 23,463 || 71–86 || 35
|-  style="text-align:center; background:#fbb;"
| 158 || September 25 || Astros || 1–4 || James (2–0) || Gaviglio (3–9) || Osuna (20) || 28,440 || 71–87 || 35½
|-  style="text-align:center; background:#bfb;"
| 159 || September 26 || Astros || 3–1 || Biagini (4–7) || Devenski (2–3) || Giles (25) || 22,828 || 72–87 || 35
|-  style="text-align:center; background:#bfb;"
| 160 || September 28 || @ Rays || 7–6 || Mayza (2–0) || Alvarado (1–6) || Giles (26) || 12,061 || 73–87 || 34 
|-  style="text-align:center; background:#fbb;"
| 161 || September 29 || @ Rays || 3–4 || Castillo (4–2) || Borucki (4–6) || Romo (25) || 13,221 || 73–88 || 34 
|-  style="text-align:center; background:#fbb;"
| 162 || September 30 || @ Rays || 4–9 || Yarbrough (16–6) || Gaviglio (3–10) || Pruitt (4) || 13,313 || 73–89 || 35
|-

Roster

Statistics

Batting
Note: G = Games played; AB = At bats; R = Runs scored; H = Hits; 2B = Doubles; 3B = Triples; HR = Home runs; RBI = Runs batted in; SB = Stolen bases; BB = Walks; AVG = Batting average; Ref. = Reference

Pitching
Note: G = Games pitched; GS = Games started; W = Wins; L = Losses; SV = Saves; ERA = Earned run average; WHIP = Walks + hits per inning pitched; IP = Innings pitched; H = Hits allowed; R = Total runs allowed; ER = Earned runs allowed; W = Walks allowed; K = Strikeouts; Ref. = Reference

Awards

Transactions

March
 On March 29, designated Sam Moll for assignment, placed Anthony Alford and Dalton Pompey on the 10-day disabled list, placed Troy Tulowitzki on the 60-day disabled list, optioned Joe Biagini, Tim Mayza, and Teoscar Hernández to Triple-A Buffalo, and selected the contracts of John Axford and Tyler Clippard.
 On March 31, outrighted Sam Moll to Triple-A Buffalo.

April
 On April 9, sent Anthony Alford on a rehab assignment to the Advanced-A Dunedin Blue Jays.
 On April 10, placed Kendrys Morales on the 10-day disabled list, and recalled Tim Mayza.
 On April 13, placed Josh Donaldson on the 10-day disabled list, and recalled Teoscar Hernández.
 On April 17, recalled Joe Biagini.
 On April 18, optioned Joe Biagini.
 On April 20, optioned Tim Mayza and Gift Ngoepe, recalled Lourdes Gurriel Jr., and activated Kendrys Morales.
 On April 21, traded Jon Berti to the Cleveland Indians for cash considerations.
 On April 23, placed John Axford on the bereavement list and recalled Tim Mayza.
 On April 27, activated John Axford and optioned Tim Mayza.
 On April 28, sent Josh Donaldson on a rehab assignment to the Advanced-A Dunedin Blue Jays.
 On April 29, optioned Devon Travis and recalled Carlos Ramírez.
 On April 30, placed Randal Grichuk on the 10-day disabled list, and recalled Gift Ngoepe.

May
 On May 3, activated Josh Donaldson, placed Justin Smoak on the paternity list, optioned Gift Ngoepe, and recalled Dwight Smith Jr. and Tim Mayza. After the first game of the doubleheader, the Blue Jays optioned Danny Barnes, placed Steve Pearce on the 10-day disabled list, recalled Joe Biagini, and selected the contract of Luis Santos.
 On May 4, designated Luis Santos for assignment, optioned Joe Biagini, Carlos Ramírez, and Dwight Smith Jr., recalled Dalton Pompey and Richard Ureña, and selected the contract of Jake Petricka.
 On May 5, optioned Jake Petricka and recalled Anthony Alford.
 On May 8, placed Roberto Osuna on the restricted list, placed Aledmys Díaz on the 10-day disabled list, and recalled Richard Ureña and Jake Petricka.
 On May 9, acquired Gio Urshela from the Cleveland Indians for cash considerations or a player to be named later.
 On May 11, placed Marcus Stroman on the 10-day disabled list, optioned Tim Mayza, and recalled Joe Biagini and Sam Gaviglio.
 On May 12, optioned Dalton Pompey and recalled Gio Urshela.
 On May 13, optioned Lourdes Gurriel Jr., designated Carlos Ramírez for assignment, and selected the contract of Deck McGuire.
 On May 14, optioned Anthony Alford.
 On May 15, recalled Dwight Smith Jr.
 On May 16, optioned Deck McGuire and recalled Danny Barnes.
 On May 18, placed Jaime García on the 10-day disabled list and recalled Deck McGuire.
 On May 21, optioned Richard Ureña and sent Randal Grichuk on a rehab assignment to the Advanced-A Dunedin Blue Jays.
 On May 22, recalled Devon Travis.
 On May 24, optioned Deck McGuire.
 On May 25, recalled Dalton Pompey.
 On May 26, activated Jaime García and optioned Dalton Pompey.
 On May 27, sent Randal Grichuk on a rehab assignment to the Double-A New Hampshire Fisher Cats.
 On May 29, sent Aledmys Díaz on a rehab assignment to the Double-A New Hampshire Fisher Cats.
 On May 30, sent Randal Grichuk on a rehab assignment to the Triple-A Buffalo Bisons.

June
 On June 1, placed Josh Donaldson on the 10-day disabled list, optioned Dwight Smith Jr. and Jake Petricka, activated Aledmys Díaz and Randal Grichuk, and recalled Tim Mayza.
 On June 9, designated Deck McGuire for assignment and claimed Preston Guilmet off waivers from the St. Louis Cardinals.
 On June 11, optioned Tim Mayza and recalled Preston Guilmet.
 On June 13, sent Marcus Stroman on a rehab assignment to the Advanced-A Dunedin Blue Jays.
 On June 16, sent Steve Pearce on a rehab assignment to the Triple-A Buffalo Bisons.
 On June 19, placed Sam Gaviglio on the paternity list and recalled Lourdes Gurriel Jr.
 On June 22, placed Danny Barnes on the 10-day disabled list, activated Sam Gaviglio and Steve Pearce, and optioned Lourdes Gurriel Jr.
 On June 23, placed Aaron Sanchez and Jaime García on the 10-day disabled list, activated Marcus Stroman, and recalled Tim Mayza.
 On June 26, designated Gio Urshela for assignment, and recalled Ryan Borucki.
 On June 28, traded Steve Pearce and cash considerations to the Boston Red Sox for Santiago Espinal.
 On June 29, selected the contract of Darnell Sweeney.
 On June 30, placed Ryan Tepera on the 10-day disabled list and recalled Jake Petricka.

July
 On July 2, optioned Darnell Sweeney and recalled Lourdes Gurriel Jr.
 On July 3, outrighted Gio Urshela to Triple-A Buffalo.
 On July 4, optioned Tim Mayza, designated Preston Guilmet for assignment, and selected the contracts of Rhiner Cruz and Luis Santos.
 On July 5, outrighted Darnell Sweeney to Triple-A Buffalo.
 On July 6, outrighted Preston Guilmet to Triple-A Buffalo.
 On July 8, placed Rhiner Cruz on the 10-day disabled list and recalled Tim Mayza.
 On July 12, sent Jaime García on a rehab assignment to the Advanced-A Dunedin Blue Jays.
 On July 13, placed Marco Estrada on the 10-day disabled list and recalled Dwight Smith Jr.
 On July 14, optioned Ryan Borucki, transferred Rhiner Cruz to the 60-day disabled list, and selected the contract of Chris Rowley.
 On July 15, placed Kevin Pillar on the 10-day disabled list, placed Lourdes Gurriel Jr. on the 7-day concussion disabled list, and activated Jaime García and Ryan Tepera.
 On July 16, optioned Chris Rowley.
 On July 20, recalled Richard Ureña.
 On July 22, activated Lourdes Gurriel Jr. and optioned Richard Ureña.
 On July 24, sent Danny Barnes on a rehab assignment to the Rookie-level Gulf Coast League Blue Jays, recalled Ryan Borucki, and optioned Tim Mayza.
 On July 26, claimed Oliver Drake, and traded Seung-hwan Oh to the Colorado Rockies for Chad Spanberger and Forrest Wall, and J. A. Happ to the New York Yankees for Brandon Drury and Billy McKinney.
 On July 27, activated Brandon Drury.
 On July 28, optioned Billy McKinney.
 On July 30, designated Oliver Drake for assignment, activated Marco Estrada, transferred Josh Donaldson to the 60-day disabled list, and traded Roberto Osuna to the Houston Astros for Ken Giles, Hector Perez, and David Paulino.
 On July 31, traded Aaron Loup to the Philadelphia Phillies for Jacob Waguespack, traded John Axford to the Los Angeles Dodgers for Corey Copping, and selected the contracts of Brandon Cumpton and Darnell Sweeney.

August
 On August 1, placed Lourdes Gurriel Jr. on the 10-day disabled list and activated Danny Barnes.
 On August 2, designated Darnell Sweeney for assignment, optioned Dwight Smith Jr., activated Ken Giles, and signed Mike Hauschild.
 On August 3, activated Kevin Pillar and optioned Brandon Cumpton.
 On August 4, traded Gio Urshela to the New York Yankees for cash considerations.
 On August 5, outrighted Darnell Sweeney to Triple-A Buffalo.
 On August 7, placed Brandon Drury on the 10-day disabled list and recalled Richard Ureña.
 On August 9, sent Aaron Sanchez on a rehab assignment to the Rookie-level Gulf Coast League Blue Jays, optioned Mike Hauschild, and recalled Thomas Pannone.
 On August 12, placed Yangervis Solarte on the 10-day disabled list, and recalled Danny Jansen.
 On August 13, designated Brandon Cumpton for assignment, optioned Danny Barnes, and selected the contract of Sean Reid-Foley.
 On August 14, acquired Bryan Baker from the Colorado Rockies as the player to be named later from the Seung-hwan Oh trade.
 On August 15, sent Aaron Sanchez on a rehab assignment to the Advanced-A Dunedin Blue Jays, optioned Thomas Pannone, and recalled Tim Mayza.
 On August 16, outrighted Brandon Cumpton.
 On August 17, placed Luke Maile on the paternity list and recalled Billy McKinney.
 On August 18, sent Lourdes Gurriel Jr. on a rehab assignment to the Double-A New Hampshire Fisher Cats.
 On August 19, placed Marcus Stroman on the 10-day disabled list, transferred Aaron Sanchez to the 60-day disabled list, optioned Luis Santos, recalled Thomas Pannone, and selected the contract of Justin Shafer.
 On August 20, activated Luke Maile, optioned Sean Reid-Foley, and sent Aaron Sanchez on a rehab assignment to the Double-A New Hampshire Fisher Cats.
 On August 21, sent Lourdes Gurriel Jr. on a rehab assignment to the Triple-A Buffalo Bisons.
 On August 24, activated Lourdes Gurriel Jr. and optioned Richard Ureña.
 On August 25, activated Aaron Sanchez and designated Jaime García for assignment.
 On August 27, designated Luis Santos for assignment, optioned Jake Petricka and Justin Shafer, recalled Danny Barnes, and selected the contract of Murphy Smith.
 On August 28, sent Josh Donaldson on a rehab assignment to Advanced-A Dunedin Blue Jays.
 On August 29, released Jaime García.
 On August 31, outrighted Luis Santos to Triple-A Buffalo, traded Josh Donaldson to the Cleveland Indians for a player to be named later (later revealed to be Julian Merryweather), and traded Curtis Granderson to the Milwaukee Brewers for Demi Orimoloye.

September
 On September 1, designated Murphy Smith for assignment, claimed Mark Leiter Jr. off waivers from the Philadelphia Phillies, and recalled José Fernández, Taylor Guerrieri, and Sean Reid-Foley.
 On September 3, activated Marcus Stroman and Mark Leiter Jr., and outrighted Murphy Smith to Triple-A Buffalo.
 On September 4, designated Mike Hauschild for assignment, placed Joe Biagini on the 10-day disabled list, selected the contract of Jonathan Davis, and recalled Jake Petricka, Dwight Smith Jr., Rowdy Tellez, and Richard Ureña.
 On September 5, recalled David Paulino.
 On September 6, recalled Reese McGuire and Justin Shafer.
 On September 7, outrighted Mike Hauschild to Triple-A Buffalo.
 On September 9, activated Yangervis Solarte.
 On September 11, placed Russell Martin on the paternity list.
 On September 14, activated Joe Biagini and Russell Martin.
 On September 17, recalled Anthony Alford.
 On September 26, transferred Brandon Drury to the 60-day disabled list, and selected the contract of Jon Berti.

October
 On October 1, recalled Dalton Pompey.
 On October 5, acquired Julian Merryweather from the Cleveland Indians as the player to be named later from the Josh Donaldson trade, and designated Jon Berti for assignment.

Farm system

Notes

References

External links
2018 Blue Jays season at Baseball Reference

Toronto Blue Jays seasons
Toronto Blue Jays
Toronto Blue Jays
Toronto Blue Jays